Saint Syrus or St Syrus may refer to:

 Syrus of Genoa (died 381), bishop of Genoa
 Syrus of Pavia (fl. 1st century AD), bishop of Pavia

See also
 San Siro, football stadium
 Siro (disambiguation)